John Clay may refer to:
John Clay (Wars of the Roses), English soldier
John Clay (chaplain) (1796–1858), English prison chaplain
John Clay (cricketer, born 1924) (1924–2011), English cricketer
John Clay (offensive tackle) (born 1964), American football player
John Clay (running back) (born 1988), American football player
John Cecil Clay (1875–1930), American illustrator 
John Granby Clay (1766–1846), British general
John Morrison Clay (1821–1887), American horse breeder
John P. Clay (1934–2013), investment banker and founder of the Clay Sanskrit Library
John Randolph Clay (1808–1885), American diplomat
Johnnie Clay (1898–1973), English cricketer
The Red-Headed League, an 1891 short story by Arthur Conan Doyle with a character named John Clay

See also
Jon Clay (born 1963), British former track and road racing cyclist